The Courageous Coward is a 1919 American silent drama film directed by William Worthington and featuring Sessue Hayakawa and Tsuru Aoki in lead roles. It is presumed to be a lost film, with only reel 5 preserved at the EYE Film Institute Netherlands film archive.

Plot
As described in a film magazine, Suki (Hayakawa), born and educated in America, still worships the customs of his ancestral country. Foreign born Rei (Aoki) arrives in Chinatown and wins his heart. He goes to college to finish his law studies, leaving Rei to await his return. Rei is led to believe that she should become Americanized to please him on his return, so she learns the way of the cabarets in the company of Tom Kirby (McDonald), son of ward boss Big Bill Kirby (Hernandez). Suki returns and is disappointed. Rei finally consents to elope with Tom, leaving Suki lost to her. A murder is committed and Suki prosecutes a suspect almost to the point of conviction when Tom confesses his guilt to him. When Suki refuses to go forward with the case, he is branded a coward and disgraced, with only Rei believing in him. At length Tom confesses to the murder and prepares to stand trial, his confession clearing Suki and leaving him free to marry Rei.

Cast
Sessue Hayakawa as Suki Iota
Tsuru Aoki as Rei Oaki
Toyo Fujita as Tangi
George Hernandez as Big Bill Kirby
Francis McDonald as Tom Kirby (credited as Francis J. McDonald)
Buddy Post as Cupid

References

External links 

 

1919 films
Silent American drama films
American black-and-white films
1919 drama films
American silent feature films
Haworth Pictures Corporation films
Lost American films
Film Booking Offices of America films
1919 lost films
Lost drama films
1910s American films